Thema S. Bryant (born 1974) is an American psychologist who is a professor of psychology at the Pepperdine University, where she directs the Culture and Trauma Research Laboratory. Her research considers interpersonal trauma and societal trauma of oppression. She was elected as the 2023 President of the American Psychological Association.

Early life and education 
Bryant is the daughter of two pastors. Throughout her childhood, she saw people from her community seeking out her father for counselling. As an adolescent, she was evacuated from Liberia during the civil war and moved to Baltimore. She completed her doctorate in clinical psychology at Duke University. Her doctoral research looked at coping strategies of African American survivors of childhood violence. She moved to Harvard Medical School as a postdoctoral researcher, where she worked with the Victims of Violence Program. Bryant then joined the Princeton University SHARE Program, where she coordinated initiatives to combat sexual assault and harassment. During her three years as SHARE coordinator, she helped train staff on culturally appropriate interventions and LGBT-related prejudice.

Research and career 
In 2005, Bryant moved to California State University, Long Beach. She stayed there for two years, until she was appointed Professor of Psychology at Pepperdine University in 2007. Her research considers the societal trauma of oppression and interpersonal trauma. 

Bryant is the host of "Homecoming", a mental health podcast. She was elected President of the American Psychological Association in 2023.

Awards and honors 
 2013 American Psychological Association Distinguished Early Career Contributions to Psychology in the Public Interest
 2016 Institute of Violence, Abuse and Trauma Media Award for the film “Psychology of Human Trafficking”
 2016 Donald Fridley Memorial Award for excellence in mentoring in the field of trauma
 2018 The California Psychological Association Distinguished Scientific Achievement in Psychology

Academic service 
Bryant was President of the Society for the Psychology of Women, a division of the American Psychological Association. She represented the APA at the United Nations. She gave evidence at the United Nations World Conference Against Racism, Racial Discrimination, Xenophobia and Related Intolerance in 2001.

Selected publications 
 
 
 
 Homecoming: Overcome Fear and Trauma to Reclaim Your Whole Authentic Self and co-author of The Antiracism Handbook: Practical Tools to Shift Your Mindset & Uproot Racism in Your Life and Community

Personal life 
Bryant is an ordained minister.

References 

1974 births
Living people
American women psychologists
21st-century American psychologists
21st-century American women scientists
Presidents of the American Psychological Association
American women podcasters
American podcasters
Duke University alumni
Harvard Medical School people
Princeton University people
California State University, Long Beach faculty
Pepperdine University faculty